Ernest Frederick Gudgeon (1880-1965), was an English bowls player who competed in two British Empire Games.

Bowls career
At the 1930 British Empire Games he won the gold medal in the rinks (fours) event with James Edney, James Frith and Albert Hough. He repeated the success four years later at the 1934 British Empire Games, this time with Robert Slater, Percy Tomlinson and Fred Biggin.

He finished runner-up in the 1929 Men's National Championships.

Personal life
He was an insurance collector and salesman by trade and lived in Brighton. He married Minnie Rose Hudson.

References

English male bowls players
Bowls players at the 1930 British Empire Games
Bowls players at the 1934 British Empire Games
Commonwealth Games gold medallists for England
Commonwealth Games medallists in lawn bowls
1880 births
1965 deaths
Medallists at the 1930 British Empire Games
Medallists at the 1934 British Empire Games